Bagadi is a village and Village Development Committee  in Kapilvastu District in the Lumbini Zone of middle-south Nepal. At the time of the 2011 Nepal census it had a population of 1000 people living in 300 indivisible houses

References

External links
UN map of the municipalities of kapilvastu District

Populated places in Bara District